Qanater (plural of Qantara, the Arabic word for bridge) may refer to:

Places

Algeria
El Kantara
El Kantara District

Egypt
 El Qantara, Egypt, a city on both sides of the Suez Canal

Giza Governorate
Manshiyat al Qanater

Qalyubia Governorate
El Qanater El Khayreya
Shibin El Qanater

Lebanon
 Qantara (Akkar), a village in Akkar District, northern  Lebanon
 Qantara, Lebanon, a village in Marjeyoun District, southern Lebanon

Spain
Alcantarilla

Syria
Qanater, Hama Governorate

Others
 Qantara.de, an Internet portal in German, English and Arabic